Cold Turkey is a 1971 satirical black comedy film starring Dick Van Dyke and a long list of comedic actors. The film was directed, coproduced and cowritten by Norman Lear and is based on the unpublished novel I'm Giving Them Up for Good by Margaret and Neil Rau.

The film was produced in 1969 but was shelved for two years by the distributor over concerns about its box-office potential.

Plot
As part of a public relations and marketing strategy to compare the empathy of Big Tobacco to the nobility of the Nobel Peace Prize, advertising executive Merwin Wren convinces the Valiant Tobacco Company to propose a challenge: a tax-free check for $25,000,000 ($ million today) to any city or town in America that can stop smoking, going cold turkey, for thirty days.

According to Wren, the offer will generate Valiant worldwide free publicity and praise as a humanitarian gesture, but no town in America would ever be able to claim the prize, with cigarette smoking being too addictive to stop.

The Reverend Clayton Brooks, a kindly but fearsome minister of the Eagle Rock Community Church, takes up the challenge as a spiritual call. He urges the economically depressed community of Eagle Rock, Iowa, to go for the prize.

The town council has been trying to woo back the military ever since it closed a base a few years earlier, hoping its return would help the local cash flow. Families have been moving out almost on a monthly basis and the town center is almost deserted.

Reverend Brooks recruits every smoker in the town to sign up. Needled for being a former smoker, he begins smoking again to find solidarity with his "flock."

As the deadline to start the thirty-day clock approaches, only a very few of the town's residents haven't signed the no smoking pledge. One of them is alcoholic Edgar Stopworth, whom Reverend Brooks decides to pay a house call on, to convince him to take the pledge. But Edgar knows himself pretty well and in desperation tells the Reverend "My drinking is directly connected to my smoking. The booze bone's connected to the smoke bone." The Reverend looks defeated but comes up with the idea of Edgar leaving town for a thirty-day vacation, which Edgar immediately departs on.

At midnight, the challenge begins. For the next thirty days, no smoking is permitted, with Eagle Rock being the only city in America that got all of its smokers to pledge.

Once the no smoking ban begins, Reverend Brooks gets extremely frustrated with not being able to smoke. His only relief is having frequent sex with his wife Natalie. At one point she barely gets finished making the bed and straightening up from the preceding episode before the Reverend is back home again for more.

The tobacco company sends Merwin to report the progress of the townspeople's commitment. The company needs just one person to fail. Among the weakest: the elderly Doctor Proctor, who must always have a cigarette before surgery, and the anxiety-ridden wife of the mayor, Mrs. Wappler, who counts the small gherkin pickles she eats as the hours pass. However, a group of 29 non-smoking residents, all members of the ultra-conservative Christopher Mott Society have been asked by Brooks to police all traffic entering Eagle Rock to ensure no tobacco products enter.

The attention of the nation's leading newscasters at the time turns the small community's efforts into a matter of highly publicized failure or success. Soon the community is invaded by buxom "massage therapists," beer vendors, souvenir shops and more. Rev. Brooks appears on a Time magazine cover, which leads him to another epiphany: if he can save the town, he will be a hero.

Merwin is told by Valiant's board members to undermine the town's efforts at all costs, doing whatever he must to get someone to smoke before the thirty days are up.

With a few minutes left to midnight, Merwin pulls out all the stops to make sure that someone smokes. He fixes it so that the town clock chimes midnight before it is midnight and has helicopters dropping cigarettes into the anxious crowd. Dr. Proctor frantically and desperately leaps into the crowd trying to smoke a cigarette. Reverend Brooks goes into the crowd to find and stop him. Merwin has a cigarette lighter shaped like a gun and is trying to get to Dr. Proctor. Odie Turman, an elderly conservative lady, has a real gun and is lurking about in the crowd. A drunken Edgar Stopworth has just arrived in time for the midnight deadline. When Merwin, Reverend Brooks and Odie meet, they accidentally drop their lighter/guns on the ground. Merwin picks up what he think is the lighter and ends up shooting Dr. Proctor. Then Edgar walks up to Merwin, takes the gun away from him and mistakenly shoots him. Odie comes over, grabs the gun, and shoots Reverend Brooks.

Ultimately Eagle Rock succeeds and wins the $25 million prize. To cash in on the publicity, The president of the United States arrives in a motorcade and makes an announcement that Eagle Rock will be the home of the new missile plant. As the film ends, it shows the huge smokestacks of the new plant spewing columns of black smoke into the air around Eagle Rock.

Cast

 Dick Van Dyke as Rev. Clayton Brooks
 Bob Newhart as Merwin Wren
 Pippa Scott as Natalie Brooks
 Tom Poston as Mr. Edgar Stopworth
 Edward Everett Horton as Hiram C. Grayson
 Bob Elliott as Hugh Upson/David Chetley/Sandy Van Andy
 Ray Goulding as Walter Chronic/Paul Hardly/Arthur Lordly
 Vincent Gardenia as Mayor Quincey L. Wappler
 Barnard Hughes as Dr. Proctor
 Graham Jarvis as Amos Bush
 Jean Stapleton as Mrs. Wappler
 Barbara Cason as Letitia Hornsby
 Judith Lowry as Odie Turman
 Sudie Bond as Cissy
 Helen Page Camp as Mrs. Watson
 Paul Benedict as Zen Buddhist
 Simon Scott as Mr. Kandiss
 Raymond Kark as Homer Watson
 Peggy Rea as Mrs. Proctor
 Woodrow Parfrey as Tobacco Executive
 George Mann as Bishop Manley
 Charles Pinney as Col. Galloway
 M. Emmet Walsh as Art
 Gloria LeRoy as Lottie Davenport (the masseuse)
 Eric Boles as Dennis
 Jack Grimes as TV Stage Manager
 Walter Sande as Tobacco Executive
 Harvey Jason as Hypnotist

Cast notes
Veteran actor Edward Everett Horton, whose career began in 1906, plays tobacco company president Hiram C. "Mr. Tobacco' Grayson in a wheelchair and without dialogue. He is shown later in a limousine where Grayson farts, possibly the first time that flatulence is depicted in a U.S. movie.  This was Horton's final role, and he died before the film was released.
Director/producer Norman Lear has a three-second cameo approximately 2/3 of the way into the film. He is shown as one of the townspeople sitting down and crying because he is unable to get a cigarette fix. He is also shown from the waist down, "kicking" a dog across the town square (the dog was actually attached to wires).
Maureen McCormick, best known for her role as Marcia Brady on television's The Brady Bunch, provides the voice of a talking doll in the film, which says "I love you! – smoking gives you cancer!"
The characters played by Bob and Ray are parodies of real-life news and broadcasting personalities: "Walter Chronic" (Walter Cronkite), "Hugh Upson" (Hugh Downs), "David Chetley" (Chet Huntley/David Brinkley), "Arthur Lordly" (Arthur Godfrey), "Paul Hardly" (Paul Harvey), and "Sandy Van Andy" (Sander Vanocur).  
The film's promotional trailer is hosted by newscasters "Hardly Reasonable" (Harry Reasoner) and "Mike Walrus" (Mike Wallace). Neither the characters nor the actors who play them appear in the actual film; "Walrus" is played by Paul Dooley.
A number of actors appearing in the film – including Jean Stapleton, Vincent Gardenia, Paul Benedict, Barnard Hughes, Judith Lowry, Barbara Cason, and Graham Jarvis — would go on to work with Lear in the coming years on his various television projects.
The only profanity used in its entirety in the film was by Judith Lowry, whose character often referred to "a bullshit." The president of the Valiant Tobacco Company was bleeped when he told David Chetley twice to "leave me the f(bleep)k alone."

Filming locations
Most of the film, which is set in the fictional small town of Eagle Rock, Iowa, was shot in and around Greenfield, Iowa, and many local people were used as extras. Some neighborhood scenes were shot in Winterset, Iowa. The Methodist church in Orient, Iowa and the bank in Macksburg, Iowa were used as well. The Grayson Mansion scenes were filmed at Terrace Hill, official residence of the governor of Iowa, located in Des Moines. The kitchen scenes with Jean Stapleton and Vincent Gardenia and several other exteriors were shot in Marshalltown, Iowa. Some were also shot in the town of Columbia in south-central Kentucky.

Soundtrack
Cold Turkey features original music by Randy Newman, including "He Gives Us All His Love", a ballad with a gospel influence that serves as the film's theme song. This was Newman's first film soundtrack.

In 2007 the Percepto Records label issued a limited-edition soundtrack CD for the film.

Release
The film premiered on January 30, 1971, at the Galaxy Theatre in Des Moines, Iowa, and it opened in 30 theaters in Iowa on February 3, 1971.

Home media
In 1993, Cold Turkey was released on VHS and LaserDisc in the pan-and-scan format. In 2010, the film was made available as a manufactured-on-demand DVD through Amazon.com.

Reception

Box office
In its first five days in 30 theatres in seven towns, the film grossed $131,616. The film went on to earn $5.5 million in theatrical rentals in the United States and Canada.

Arthur Krim of United Artists later assessed the film during an evaluation of the company's inventory:
An old commitment to Dick Van Dyke, and what seemed to be a good idea for the American market, became an overpriced film with a has-been personality by the time of  release. Albeit funny, the picture is way overpriced for its value, which is strictly for the American market – mainly for mid America. The producer and director went over a million dollars over budget on the film to deliver a minor American comedy with no overseas value. This film would be programmed today only if it could be made at one-half the cost.

Critical reception
Vincent Canby of The New York Times wrote that "it is, within its limitations, a very engaging, very funny movie." Variety called it "an often-hilarious, partly-muffed contemporary comedy" marred by "sluggish pacing" and a climax called "bizarre: Lear seems to have written himself into a corner, with no way out except to shift abruptly from human comedy to stylistic nonsense." Roger Ebert of the Chicago Sun-Times awarded the film four stars and praised several aspects of the production before concluding: "Even if you don't smoke, you'll find Cold Turkey funny." Gene Siskel of the Chicago Tribune awarded it two and a half stars out of four, calling it "a fine and funny idea for a short film," but "scene after scene runs too long. Too many gags are repeated too often." Charles Champlin of the Los Angeles Times called it "an enterprising, very amusing, very contemporary social commentary." Gary Arnold of The Washington Post wrote: "A shallow, self-deluding sort of comedy, it fails to make sense out of its own premise and characters and then tries to cover up by getting cynical about everything-in-general. It's as if Lear had been inspired to imitate Billy Wilder at his worst."

See also
 List of American films of 1971

References

External links

 

1971 films
1971 comedy films
1971 directorial debut films
1970s black comedy films
American black comedy films
1970s satirical films
American satirical films
Films about competitions
Films about smoking
Films based on American novels
Films directed by Norman Lear
Films scored by Randy Newman
Films set in Iowa
Films shot in Iowa
Films with screenplays by Norman Lear
Smoking cessation
United Artists films
1970s English-language films
Films produced by Norman Lear
1970s American films